Pawtuxet Village is a section of the New England cities of Warwick and Cranston, Rhode Island.  It is located at the point where the Pawtuxet River flows into the Providence River and Narragansett Bay.

History 
Pawtuxet means "Little Falls" in the Narragansett language, and this area was originally occupied by the Sononoce Pawtuxet tribe, part of the larger Narragansett Indian tribe. In 1638, Rhode Island founder Roger Williams purchased the property extending south from Providence to the Pawtuxet River. Shortly after, his followers William Arnold, William Harris, William Carpenter, and Zachariah Rhodes settled along the fertile meadows of the Pawtuxet. Meanwhile, Samuel Gorton purchased the land south of the Pawtuxet River and became the founder of Warwick.

Early 18th century inhabitants took advantage of the power of the Pawtuxet River by constructing various mills, and took advantage of its excellent harbor by building one of America's premier shipping ports. The Pawtuxet Village Historic District boasts dozens of preserved Colonial structures among its scenic blend of homes and buildings.  The mouth of the Pawtuxet River was a strategic location to settle, and gave boats a safe harbor and the village considerable importance in the triangular trade of the day, and shipyards for the coastal and West Indies trade were located here.

It was here in 1772 where Rhode Island patriots took the first organized military action towards independence by attacking and burning the hated British revenue schooner .  This was America's "First Blow for Freedom", known as the Gaspee Affair, and led directly to the establishment of permanent Committees of Correspondence, unifying the individual colonies, and starting the process of the American Revolution.  The cities of Cranston and Warwick celebrate this historic role of Pawtuxet Village by hosting the annual Gaspee Days Parade each June.

During the early 19th century, Christopher and William Rhodes formed the textile manufacturing firm which controlled the prosperity and swayed the destiny of Pawtuxet for more than half a century. It changed from a shipping port to a mill village with textile mills at either end of the Pawtuxet Falls. Pawtuxet shops and businesses of the 19th century may be seen on old advertising maps from about 1862 to 1870.
  
In the late 19th century, the Rhodes family developed one of Rhode Island's top attractions called the Rhodes-on-the-Pawtuxet casino, dance hall, and canoe center. Trolley lines from Providence carried vast numbers to the Pawtuxet area for entertainment.

In the 21st Century, Pawtuxet Village became known as a food destination, with eateries ranging from a tea room, Parisian cafe, Irish pub, Thai restaurant, creperie, ice cream, and more. The Friends of Pawtuxet Village host an annual Taste of Pawtuxet event to highlight local eateries.

Notable residents
 Elisha Hunt Rhodes (1842–1917), soldier of the 2nd Rhode Island Volunteers and diarist of the Civil War

See also
 
 The Experiment, a horse powered boat first tested here.
 National Register of Historic Places listings in Providence County, Rhode Island
 National Register of Historic Places listings in Kent County, Rhode Island
 The Case of Charles Dexter Ward, a 1927 story by H. P. Lovecraft, partially set in the village

References

External links

 Pawtuxet Village
 Gaspee Days Committee
 Pawtuxet Village Association
 Friends of Pawtuxet Village

Cranston, Rhode Island
Historic districts in Kent County, Rhode Island
Historic districts in Providence County, Rhode Island
Historic districts on the National Register of Historic Places in Rhode Island
History of the textile industry
National Register of Historic Places in Kent County, Rhode Island
National Register of Historic Places in Providence County, Rhode Island
Villages in Rhode Island
Warwick, Rhode Island